Harold Dimke (born 21 November 1949) is a German rower who competed for SC Dynamo Berlin. He won medals at international rowing competitions.

References 

1949 births
Living people
People from East Berlin
Rowers from Berlin
East German male rowers
Olympic medalists in rowing
Olympic bronze medalists for East Germany
Olympic rowers of East Germany
Rowers at the 1972 Summer Olympics
Medalists at the 1972 Summer Olympics
European Rowing Championships medalists